Raj Rangasala is a multi-purpose stadium in Rajbiraj, Saptari. The stadium is located in the central part of the city and has a seating capacity of 7,000. This rangasala was built in 1979 in 2 bigha 7 katha and 4 dhur. It is the biggest stadium in saptari district. The rangasala is named after Rajbiraj city.

History
The rangasala is one of the oldest stadiums in Nepal.The then governor of Saptari Badahakim Lakshya Bahadhur Gurung initiated building the stadium for sporting events in Rajbiraj in 1979.

Sports Event
 PM Cup 2073

References

Cricket grounds in Nepal
Saptari District
1979 establishments in Nepal